Friedrich August Stüler (28 January 1800 – 18 March 1865) was an influential Prussian architect and builder. His masterpiece is the Neues Museum in Berlin, as well as the dome of the triumphal arch of the main portal of the Berliner Schloss.

Life
Stüler was born on 28 January 1800 in Mühlhausen. In 1818 he started studying architecture and became a student of Karl Friedrich Schinkel in Berlin. After travelling to France and Italy together with Eduard Knoblauch in 1829 and 1830 and to Russia together with Heinrich Strack in 1831, Stüler became Hofbauinspektor (Royal Buildings Inspector), Hofbaurat (Royal privy councillor for buildings) and director of the commission for the building of the Berliner Stadtschloss in 1832. In 1837, he planned the rebuilding of the Winter Palace in Saint Petersburg, but failed to realise these plans because Tsar Nicholas I of Russia decided to rebuild the original Baroque/Rococo palace instead of Stülers Neo-Renaissance concept. Stüler then returned to Berlin, where King Frederick William IV of Prussia opened a huge array of tasks to him, making him Architekt des Königs (Royal architect) in 1842.

Together with King Frederick William, who had previously (since his first journey to Italy in 1828) studied Italian architecture, Stüler incorporated Classical antiquity and Renaissance architecture in what was to become Prussian Arcadia. They also conceived a recourse to early Christian motives such as the liturgy of the Early church to avoid political problems with the contemporary church. After the death of Ludwig Persius, Stüler assumed control of the building of the Friedenskirche in Potsdam in 1845. Joint journeys to Italy of Stüler and King Frederick William in 1858–59 deepened the Italian influence from medieval and Quattrocento buildings. His ideas for Cast-iron architecture or the techniques he used for the Neues Museum are more likely influenced from a journey to England in 1842. The building was badly damaged during World War II, but was reopened in 2009.

Stüler died in Berlin, where he is buried in the Dorotheenstadt cemetery.

Works

While many of the buildings Stüler built were destroyed in World War II, a few were restored – not in the original ways, but one can still see Stülers concepts on the outside, especially in the Jakobi church in Berlin.

Commonly, Stüler is viewed as a student of Karl Friedrich Schinkel as well as an architect of his own right, combining the wishes of Frederick William, Schinkels Classicism and the new Historicism of the Wilhelminian era, though he didn't refer to himself as a student of Schinkel.

His works were:
 1827–1831 probably restoring of the Dorfkirche Parchen
 1837 Planned the restoration of the Winter Palace in Saint Petersburg
 1834–1837 St. Peter und Paul auf Nikolskoje, Berlin-Zehlendorf
 1839–1843 Schloss Alt-Autz
 1842 Conversion of the Kurfürstliches Schloss in Koblenz
 1842–45 Addendum to the Franziskaner-Klosterkirche in Berlin
 1843–44 Jagdschloss Letzlingen
 1853–55 Dorfkirche in Basedow (Mecklenburg)
 1843–1855 Neues Museum
 1844–1845 St. Jacobi-Kirche in Berlin-Kreuzberg
 1844–1863 University of Königsberg
 1844–1846 St. Matthäus-Church, Berlin-Tiergarten
 around 1845 Royal Castle in Breslau, (destroyed 1945)
 1845–1854 Friedenskirche in Potsdam
 1845 Evangelical church in Wiehl-Drabenderhöhe
 1845 plans for the Emanuelkirche, Schirwindt (dedicated 1856, destroyed 1944)
 1846–1856 Interior design of the reconstructed Roman Palace auditorium (sog. Basilika), Trier, (destroyed)
 1847–1853 Castle of the Fürsten Radolin in Jarotschin
 1847–1863 Belvedere auf dem Pfingstberg, Potsdam
 1848–1852 Church in Caputh, Brandenburg
 City church St. Johannis in Niemegk
 1848–1866 National Museum of Fine Arts in Stockholm
 1850–1867 Burg Hohenzollern
1850: grave monument to lieutenant general Friedrich Wilhelm von Rauch on the Invalids´Cemetery in Berlin
 1851–1864 Orangerie in Potsdam
 1851 Triumphal gate am Mühlenberg, Potsdam
 1851 Schwerin Castle
 1853 St. Archangel Michael's Church in Rietavas, Lithuania 
 1851–1857 Bridge over the Vistula in Dirschau
1851–59 Two guard barracks across from the Charlottenburg Palace (now home to the Scharf-Gerstenberg Collection and the Berggruen Museum), Berlin
 1852–1859 Barracks of the "Garde du Corps" across from Schloss Charlottenburg in Berlin-Charlottenburg
 1853–1856 Restoration of the Lutherhaus in Lutherstadt Wittenberg 
 1854–1855 Bornstedter Kirche, Potsdam
 1855–1861 Wallraf-Richartz-Museum, Cologne, (destroyed)
 1857 Addendum to the Church St. Johannis in Berlin-Moabit, originally built by Schinkel (Portico, Colonnade, Vicarage and Steeple)
 1857–1860 Trinitatis Church, Cologne
 1858 Werdersche Kirche, Werder an der Havel
 1858–1859 Dorfkirche in Stolpe, Berlin-Wannsee
 1858–1874 Domkandidatenstift in Berlin-Mitte (completed by Stüve)
 1859 Conversion of Schloss Prötzel
 1859–1866 Neue Synagoge in Berlin-Mitte
 1859–1861 Schlosskirche of the Jagdschloss Letzlingen
 1859–1862 Dorfkirche Pinnow (near Oranienburg)
 1860–1864 Klassizistische Orangerie of the Zehnthof in Sinzig
 1860 Timber-framed church in Dippmannsdorf
 1862–1865 Hungarian Academy of Sciences, Budapest
 1862–1876 Alte Nationalgalerie in Berlin-Mitte
 1864–1866 Pfarrkirche St. Nicolai in Oranienburg
 1864 Concept of the Twelve-Apostle-Church in Berlin-Schöneberg, built 1871–74 by Hermann Blankenstein
 1865 Conversion of the castle of Neustrelitz (posthumously)
1867 Stadtkirche in Fehrbellin (posthumously)

References

External links

  (short biography in German)
 Very short Biography in English
 

1800 births
1865 deaths
People from Mühlhausen
German neoclassical architects
People from the Province of Saxony
Recipients of the Royal Gold Medal
Recipients of the Pour le Mérite (civil class)
19th-century German architects
Burials at the Dorotheenstadt Cemetery